Larry Harris may refer to:
Larry Harris (basketball), former general manager of the Milwaukee Bucks
Larry Harris (computer scientist), American computer scientist and businessman
Larry Harris (game designer), board game designer
Larry Harris (record label executive), co-founder of Casablanca Records
Larry Harris (U.S. Marine), Silver Star recipient